David Petersen (born July 4, 1977) is an American comic book creator best known for the series Mouse Guard.

Early life
David Petersen was influenced by animated television series such as The Transformers.

He declared:

Petersen originally attended Mott Community College in Flint, Michigan, and then transferred to Eastern Michigan University, where he earned his degree in Fine Arts.

Career
The first Mouse Guard mini-series established the Guard's origin. Future series were intended to feature more character development, and greater exposition of the book's setting and history.

The story and characters of 1149, which was to be later known as Mouse Guard, originally involved several different types of animals, but during college Petersen reexamined his story and transformed it from the culture of the several other species into the story of life as mice living a sheltered civilization that only walked the open wild if a specialized mouse group escorted them: the Mouse Guard. After establishing the culture of these mice, Petersen felt that the rest of the animal cultures were only distractions for what he felt the real heart of the story would be: "the mice overcoming the obstacles of being in a world too big for them".

Bibliography

Children's books
None of these books were published for mass release, though Petersen did make bound editions of several of them for presents (mainly for his wife, Julia). All these books have been placed on the web by David Petersen.
 Papa Bear
 Rest In Peace Bailey Bear (2004)
 The Mouse And The Cardinal
 Maddie + The Monster
 What Emma Will Be (2005)
 Kate's Escape (2005)

Comic books
 Voices (2004, ComiXpress) - Anthology of five comic artists, each having four pages.  Released in conjunction with a gallery show.  David Petersen's contribution, Fir Darrig, was rereleased in Ye Olde Lore Of Yore, Volume 1.  20 pgs, black and white interiors.
 Ye Olde Lore Of Yore, Volume 1 (2005, ComiXpress) - Anthology of five stories; two by Jeremy Bastian, two by David Petersen, and one by Jeremy Bastian & David Petersen.  36 pgs, black and white interiors.
 Mouse Guard (2006–present, Archaia Studios Press)
  Dragon Prince (2008) #4 Cover
 Mister Stuffins (2009) #1-3 Variant Covers
 Muppet Peter Pan (2009) #1-4 Covers
 Muppet Robin Hood (2009) #1-4 Covers
 Muppet King Arthur (2010) #1-4 Covers
 Muppet Snow White (2010) #1-4 Covers
 Muppet Sherlock Holmes (2010) #1 Cover
 Fraggle Rock (2010) Volume 2 Issue #1 Cover
 Teenage Mutant Ninja Turtles (2011) Micro-Series Volume 1 Issues #1-4 Covers; Volume 2 Issues #1-4 Covers
 Avengers Now (2013) #24 Variant Cover
 TMNT: Turtles in Time (2014) #1-4 Covers
 Rocket Raccoon (2014) #1 Variant Cover
 Star Wars (2014) #1 Variant Cover
 Jim Henson's The Storyteller: Dragons (2015) #1 Cover, Hardcover collected edition cover
 Locke & Key: Small World (2016) Variant Cover
 Farlaine the Goblin (2018) #7 Variant Cover
 Labyrinth: Coronation (2018) #1 Variant Cover
 Beneath the Dark Crystal (2018-2019) Volume 1 Issues #1-12 Variant Covers
 Folklords (2019) #1 Variant Cover

Illustrated Novels
 The Wind in the Willows (2016) The novel includes over 60 original illustrations set into the original Kenneth Grahame prose.

References

External links 

FlamesRising.com Interview, February 2010
Exploring The Multiverse Video Interview, April 2010
HollywoodJesus.com Interview , July 2010
Comic Geek Speak Podcast interview (May, 2007)

American comics artists
American comics writers
1977 births
Living people
Writers from Flint, Michigan
Eastern Michigan University alumni